Marshall Franklin "Shorty" Guill (September 20, 1897 – May 11, 1931) was an American football and baseball player for the Georgia Tech Golden Tornado of the Georgia Institute of Technology. He was a member of the ANAK Society. He graduated with an M. E. in 1918.

Early years
Guill was born in Sparta, Georgia on September 20, 1897 to  Marshall Abner Guill and Zella Ada Moore.

Georgia Tech

Guill was a prominent quarterback and end on John Heisman's Georgia Tech Golden Tornado football team.

1916
He played during Tech's 222–0 rout of Cumberland in 1916.

1917
Guill was a starter for the school's first national championship team in 1917, which outscored opponents 491 to 17.

1919
Guill played as quarterback for much of 1919, shifted to end in the latter part of the year for newcomer Jack McDonough.

Death
He was killed in an automobile collision on the New London-New Haven highway near Guilford, Connecticut on May 11, 1931. At the time of his death he was connected with the American Moistener Corporation of Charlotte, North Carolina.

See also 

 List of Georgia Tech Yellow Jackets starting quarterbacks

References

External links

American football ends
Georgia Tech Yellow Jackets baseball players
Georgia Tech Yellow Jackets football players
1897 births
1931 deaths
Players of American football from Georgia (U.S. state)
People from Sparta, Georgia
All-Southern college football players
American football quarterbacks
Road incident deaths in Connecticut